Antona fallax is a moth of the subfamily Arctiinae first described by Arthur Gardiner Butler in 1877. It is found in Brazil.

References

Lithosiini
Moths described in 1877
Moths of South America